Globiceps  is a genus of plant-feeding insects of the family Miridae.

Selected species
Species within this genus include:
 Globiceps flavomaculatus:
 Globiceps fulvicollis:
 Globiceps salicicola:
 Globiceps sphaegiformis (Rossi, 1790):

References

Miridae genera